The Psychodynamic Diagnostic Manual (PDM) is a diagnostic handbook similar to the International Statistical Classification of Diseases and Related Health Problems (ICD) or the Diagnostic and Statistical Manual of Mental Disorders (DSM). The PDM was published on May 28, 2006.

The information contained in the PDM was collected by a collaborative task force which includes members of the American Psychoanalytic Association, the International Psychoanalytical Association, the Division of Psychoanalysis (Division 39) of the American Psychological Association, the American Academy of Psychoanalysis and Dynamic Psychiatry, and the National Membership Committee on Psychoanalysis in Clinical Social Work.

Although it is based on current neuroscience and treatment outcome studies, Benedict Carey pointed out in an 2006 New York Times article that many of the concepts in the PDM are adapted from the classical psychoanalytic tradition of psychotherapy. For example, the PDM indicates that the anxiety disorders may be traced to the "four basic danger situations" described by Sigmund Freud (1926)  as the loss of a significant other; the loss of love; the loss of body integrity; and the loss of affirmation by one's own conscience. It uses a new perspective on the existing diagnostic system as it enables clinicians to describe and categorize personality patterns, related social and emotional capacities, unique mental profiles, and personal experiences of the patient.

The PDM is not intended to compete with the DSM or ICD. The authors report the work emphasizes "individual variations as well as commonalities" by "focusing on the full range of mental functioning" and serves as a "[complement to] the DSM and ICD efforts in cataloguing symptoms.  The task force intends for the PDM to augment the existing diagnostic taxonomies by providing "a multi dimensional approach to describe the intricacies of the patient's overall functioning and ways of engaging in the therapeutic process.".

With the publication of the DSM-3 in 1980, the manual switched from a psychoanalytically influenced dimensional model to a "neo-Kraepelinian" descriptive symptom-focused model based on present versus absent symptoms. The PDM provided a return to a psychodynamic model for the nosological evaluation of symptom clusters, personality dimensions, and dimensions of mental functioning.

Taxonomy

Dimension I: Personality Patterns and Disorders 

This first dimension classifies personality patterns in two domains.  First, it looks at the spectrum of personality types and places the person's personality on a continuum from unhealthy and maladaptive to healthy and adaptive. Second, it classifies how the person "organizes mental functioning and engages the world".

The task force adds, "This dimension has been placed first in the PDM system because of the accumulating evidence that symptoms or problems cannot be understood, assessed, or treated in the absence of an understanding of the mental life of the person who has the symptoms".  In other words, a list of symptoms characteristic of a diagnosis does not adequately inform a clinician how to understand and treat the symptoms without proper context.  By analogy, if a patient went to her physician complaining of watering eyes and a runny nose, the symptoms alone do not indicate the appropriate treatment.  Her symptoms could be a function of seasonal allergies, a bacterial sinus infection, the common cold, or she may have just come from her grandmother's funeral.  The doctor might treat allergies with an antihistamine, the sinus infection with antibiotics, the cold with zinc, and give her patient a Kleenex tissue after the funeral.  All four conditions may have very similar symptoms; all four condition are treated very differently.

Dimension II: Mental Functioning 
Next, the PDM provides a "detailed description of emotional functioning" which are understood to be "the capacities that contribute to an individual's personality and overall level of psychological health or pathology".  This dimension provides a "microscopic" examination of the patient's mental life by systematically accounting for their functional capacity to
 Process information
 Self-regulate
 Establish and maintain relationships
 Experience, organize, and express feelings and emotions at different levels
 Represent, differentiate, and integrate experience
 Utilize appropriate coping strategies and defense mechanisms
 Accurately observe oneself and others
 Form internal values and standards

Dimension III: Manifest Symptoms and Concerns 

The third dimension starts with the DSM-IV-TR diagnostic categories; moreover, beyond simply listing symptoms, the PDM "goes on to describe the affective states, cognitive processes, somatic experiences, and relational patterns most often associated clinically" with each diagnosis.  In this dimension, "symptom clusters" are "useful descriptors" which presents the patient's "symptom patterns in terms of the patient's personal experience of his or her prevailing difficulties".  The task force concludes, "The patient may evidence a few or many patterns, which may or may not be related, and which should be seen in the context of the person's personality and mental functioning.  The multi dimensional approach... provides a systematic way to describe patients that is faithful to their complexity and helpful in planning appropriate treatments".

The new edition (PDM-2) 
Guilford Press published a new edition of the Psychodynamic Diagnostic Manual (PDM-2), developed by a steering committee composed by Vittorio Lingiardi (Editor), Nancy McWilliams (Editor), and Robert S. Wallerstein (Honorary Chair). Guilford Press received a manuscript for PDM-2 in September 2016, and the release date was June 20, 2017.

Like the PDM-1, the PDM-2 classifies patients on three axes: 'P-Axis - Personality Syndromes', 'M-Axis - Profiles of Mental Functioning', and 'S-Axis - Symptom Patterns: The Subjective Experience'. The P-Axis is intended to be viewed as a "map" of personality instead of a listing of personality disorders as in the DSM-5 and ICD-10. The PDM-2 defines different terms as part of the P-Axis including "personality", "character", "temperament", "traits", "type", "style", and "defense". The S-Axis bears a lot of similarity to the DSM and ICD due to the inclusion of predominantly psychotic disorders, mood disorders, disorders related primarily to anxiety, event- and stressor-related disorders, somatic symptom disorders and addiction disorders.

See also
Diagnostic and Statistical Manual of Mental Disorders
DSM-IV Codes
International Statistical Classification of Diseases and Related Health Problems
ICD-10

References

External links 
Website of the Psychodynamic Diagnostic Manual
APA News monitor: Five psychoanalytic associations collaborate to publish a new diagnostic manual.

2006 non-fiction books
Medical manuals
Classification of mental disorders
Books about psychoanalysis